The Langley Gold Medal, or Samuel P. Langley Medal for Aerodromics, is an award given by the Smithsonian Institution for outstanding contributions to the sciences of aeronautics and astronautics.  Named in honor of Samuel P. Langley, the Smithsonian's third Secretary, it was authorized by the Board of Regents in 1909.

The medal was suggested by Alexander Graham Bell. It is awarded for "meritorious investigations in connection with the science of aerodromics and its application to aviation".

List of award winners

(Reference unless given individually)
1910 Orville and Wilbur Wright   
1913 Glenn Curtiss, Gustave Eiffel
1927 Charles Lindbergh
1929 Charles M. Manly (posthumously awarded), Richard E. Byrd
1935 Joseph S. Ames
1955 Jerome Clarke Hunsaker
1960 Robert H. Goddard (posthumously awarded) 
1962 Hugh Latimer Dryden
1964 Alan Shepard 
1967 Wernher von Braun
1971 Samuel C. Phillips 
1976 James E. Webb 
1976 Grover Loening
1981 Charles Stark Draper
1981 Robert T. Jones
1983 Ross Perot, Jr. and Jay Coburn
1987 Barry Goldwater 
1992 Benjamin O. Davis, Jr.
1999 Neil Armstrong, Buzz Aldrin and Michael Collins

See also

 List of aviation awards

References

Smithsonian Institution
Civil awards and decorations of the United States
American science and technology awards
Aviation awards
Awards established in 1910